The Ulysses broadcast occurred on Bloomsday 1982 when the Irish state broadcaster, RTÉ Radio, transmitted an uninterrupted 30-hour dramatised radio performance, by 33 actors of the RTÉ Players, of the entire text of James Joyce's epic 1922 novel, Ulysses, to commemorate the centenary of the author's birth (born 2 February 1882). The broadcast was carried by live relay internationally and won a Jacob's Broadcasting Award in recognition of its achievement.

The full 30-hour broadcast was repeated for the first time in 38 years on RTÉ Radio 1 Extra on 16 June 2020, beginning at 8 am. The decision to repeat the broadcast was influenced by the death of Joyce's grandson and literary estate executor, Stephen Joyce, in January 2020 and by the quarantine introduced in Ireland to limit the spread of the COVID-19 virus.

The novel Ulysses contains about 265,000 words from a vocabulary of 30,030 words. This record-breaking and historic live literary broadcast was originally released to the public, after the broadcast, as a recording on 20 audio cassettes in 1982 and later digitally remastered on CD in two formats: as a 32-CD boxed set, and as a three-CD set of MP3 audio files, released in 2004 (OCLC 315482641 and 605276262).

Track listing (MP3 version)

Broadcast personnel (the RTÉ Players)

Narrators 
 Conor Farrington
 Peter Dix
 Brendan Cauldwell
 Aiden Grennell
 Tomas Studley
 Deirdre O'Meara

Cast
 Leopold Bloom – Ronnie Walsh
 Molly Bloom – Pegg Monahan
 Stephen Dedalus – Patrick Dawson
 Buck Mulligan – Gerry McArdle
 Mr. Deasy – Brendan Cauldwell
 Myles Crawford – Seamus Forde
 Bantam Lyons – Jim Reid
 Simon Dedalus – Eamon Keane
 Haines – Laurence Foster
 Miss Douce – Colette Proctor
 Miss Kennedy – Barbara McCaughey
 Nosy Flynn – Gerald Fitzmahony
 Ben Dollard – Breandán Ó Dúill
 Ned Lambert – Denis Staunton
 W.B. Murphy – Liam O'Callaghan
 Cyril Sargent – Brendan Conroy
 Colm – Colm Hefferon
 Zoe Higgins – Marcella O'Riordan
 Bella Cohen – Eileen Colgan
 John Henry Menton – Eoin White
 The Nymph – Cathryn Brennan
 Virag – Christopher Casson
 Old Gummy Granny – Neasa Ní Annracháin
 Stephen's Mother – Joan Plunkett
 Mrs. Yelverton-Barry – Daphne Carroll
 Cissy Caffrey – Kate Minogue
 Alf Bergin – Joe Taylor
 The Gaffer – Ivan Hanly

Production personnel
 Text Consultant – Roland McHugh
 Sound Supervision – Marcus Mac Donald
 Executive Producer – Micheál Ó hAodha
 Director – William Styles

References

External links
Photograph of actors at recording
 Ulysses audiobook: the entire recording
 The entire recording in 18 parts at RTÉ Culture

Literature albums by Irish artists
Audiobooks by title or series
Live spoken word albums
Bloomsday
RTÉ Radio
Ulysses (novel)
Spoken word albums by Irish artists
1980s spoken word albums